Matheson is a census-designated place (CDP) and post office in and governed by Elbert County, Colorado, United States. The CDP is a part of the Denver–Aurora–Lakewood, CO Metropolitan Statistical Area. The Matheson post office has the ZIP Code 80830. At the United States Census 2020, the population of the Matheson CDP was 79.

History
The town was named after Duncan Matheson, the original owner of the town site.

Geography

Demographics

In popular culture
The television series Honey, I Shrunk the Kids: The TV Show is set in Matheson, Colorado. However, the series portrays Matheson as much larger, a hub of high-tech industry, and located somewhere in the mountains west of Denver.

See also

 List of census-designated places in Colorado

References

External links

 Matheson @ Colorado.com
 Elbert County website

Unincorporated communities in Elbert County, Colorado
Unincorporated communities in Colorado
Denver metropolitan area